Sangagiri is a panchayat town in Salem district in the Indian state of Tamil Nadu. It is situated on the National Highway 544, on the Coimbatore - Salem section.

Sangagiri is known for Sangagiri fort, lorries and lorry building industries. It is the headquarters of Sangagiri revenue district comprising Edappadi. It is also headquarters of Sangagiri educational district.

Etymology 
Sangagiri, pronounced as San-ga-giri in Tamil. Sangu means conch and Giri means hill.

History  

In sangam age, Sangagiri was comes under Mazhanadu. It was also called as Kundrathur. Sangagiri Fort was built in the 15th century by the Vijayanagar empire. It was later under the control of Dheeran Chinnamalai and Tippu Sultan before the British annexed it to their territory. Dheeran Chinnamalai was hanged by the British at Sangagiri Fort on 31 July 1805. The fort later served as a British tax storage facility for Kongu Nadu and the town developed around it.

Geography

Demographics

Population 
According to the 2011 census, Sangagiri had a population of 29,467. Male constitute 52% of the population and female 48%. Sankari has an average literacy rate of 68%, higher than the national average of 59.5%: Male literacy is 75%, and female literacy is 60%. In Sankari, 10% of the population is under 6 years of age. 40% percent of the people are engaged in agriculture, the remaining are lorry proprietors.

Religion 
Kongu Vellalar Gounder and Vanniar castes are the majority population in Sangagiri.

Government and politics  
Sangagiri Assembly Constituency is the state assembly constituency in Salem district, Tamil Nadu, India. It comprises Sangagiri taluk and a portion of Omalur taluk. It is a part of the wider Namakkal constituency for national elections to the Parliament of India. Refer

Economy 
The economy of the town was predominantly dependent on agriculture. Over the past decade Logistics and related services, Cement, Steel, Spinning mills and Body building industries have developed around the town contributing to the economy. Sangagiri is well known for its truck logistics industry and SLOA(Sangagiri Lorry Owners Association) one of the biggest in India. Some famous long existent truck fleet operators from Sangagiri are AST, SSPT, MM Roadways, KRN, Murugan, SPP, Triveni, SKP, SNR, Sankari Roadways, SPN, KKC, Simon, Sri Vari, AM TRANSPORT and MST. SLOA also runs the fuel station with No.1 Sales in India for 8 consecutive years located on Salem main road, Sangagiri. Many famous private bus companies like SPBT and Shanmugam bus service operate out of Sangagiri.
There is a cement plant of the renowned India Cements Limited which has a production capacity of 2000T/day and of late lorry industry in Sangagiri is fast picking up with Tiruchengode and Namakkal, places renowned for truck industry in the country. Industry in Sangagiri are dominated by Kongu Vellalar ,Vanniar and Chettiar Castes.

Culture/Cityscape

Tourist Attractions 
Sangagiri Fort

Transport

By Air  
The nearest airport to this town is Coimbatore International Airport, which is 117 kms away. Alternately, one can reach through Tiruchirappalli International Airport, from a distance of 142 kms.

By Rail  
Sangagiri railway station is also called as Sankari Durg railway station (SGE), which is a B grade station in Salem division. It has train services to/from major cities nearby.

The nearest railway junctions are Erode and Salem. It is not so crowdy because it is located away from the town, meanwhile people around Sangagiri requested southern railways through Salem division for more trains to halt here. There are 14 trains halt here daily. Among 14, three are express trains. They are:
Yercaud express ,
West coast express,
KSR Bengaluru intercity express.

Notable people
 P. V. Nandhidhaa, Indian Chess player, India's 17th Woman Grandmaster. Refer List of Indian chess players.

 Edappadi K. Palaniswami, 7th Chief Minister of Tamil Nadu, Refer Chief Ministers of Tamil Nadu
 Sangagiri Rajkumar, notable film director of Tamil cinema industry.

See also
Vaikuntham

References

External links

 Sankagiri-fort and Town

Cities and towns in Salem district